Sławoj is a Slavic given name consists of two parts: "sława/slava" - which means "fame", and "woj/voj" - which means "war, warrior". Alternative forms: Wojsław, Vojislav. The name may refer to:

Karel Slavoj Amerling, a Czech teacher, writer and philosopher
Sławoj Leszek Głódź, a Polish prelate of the Catholic Church
Felicjan Sławoj Składkowski, a Polish physician, general,  Minister of Internal Affairs and former Prime Minister of Poland
Slavoj Žižek, a Slovenian continental philosopher and critical theorist

See also

Slavic names
Slavoj

Slavic masculine given names
Polish masculine given names